Recruits: Paramedics is an Australian factual television program that premiered on Network Ten on 6 October 2011. It follows the work lives of new recruit paramedics in Australia, showing some of the content of their 8-week preliminary theory course, as well as clips from their first shifts on the front line. To date, 13 episodes have aired. Recruits Paramedics follows the journey of everyday people setting out to achieve a lifelong ambition to become a paramedic. Offering unique insights into the high pressure world of paramedics, we are taken into the everyday lives of new recruits as they transform their overpowering motivation to save lives into reality.

Featured recruits
Rebecca Begnell - 35 year old, former care sales supervisor
Carleigh Dunn - 21 year old, former office worker
Blake Field - 21 year old, former lifeguard
Jenna Howell - 24 year old, former vet assistant
Reynir Potter - 25 year old, former part-time firefighter
Danielle Stroinec - 27 year old, former bookseller (retail)
Evan Terry - former IT programmer
Dan Versluis - former nurse
John Williams - 24 year old, former gym attendant and fire fighter

DVD release
All 13 Episodes are available on DVD. The DVD was released on 1 November 2012

JBHIFI Stockist

Episodes

References

Australian factual television series
Network 10 original programming
Television shows set in New South Wales
2011 Australian television series debuts
English-language television shows
Emergency medical responders